The 1927 Volta a Catalunya was the ninth edition of the Volta a Catalunya cycle race and was held from 28 August to 4 September 1927. The race started and finished in Barcelona. The race was won by Victor Fontan.

Route and stages

General classification

References

1927
Volta
1927 in Spanish road cycling
September 1927 sports events